Xavier Villaurrutia y González (27 March 1903 – 25 December 1950) was a Mexican poet, playwright and literary critic whose most famous works are the short theatrical dramas called Autos profanos, compiled in the work Poesía y teatro completos, published in 1953.

Early life 
Xavier Villaurrutia was born in Mexico City in 1903. He studied in the Escuela Nacional Preparatoria (National Preparatory School) and in the Escuela de Jurisprudencia (Jurisprudence School). During that time, he felt a certain affinity to writing so he decided to dedicate his life to writing literature.

In 1928, he joined the grupo de los Contemporáneos (Contemporaries).  In 1935, he received a scholarship to study theatre at Yale University. Returning to Mexico in 1937, he started working for the local newspaper, Letras de Mexico.

Along with Salvador Novo, they founded the magazine Ulises in 1927.

Professional achievements 
Professionally, Villaurrutia worked for the Mexican literary review, Contemporáneos (literally "Contemporaries"), from 1928 to 1931. Villaurrutia would later found the first experimental theater in Mexico.

Notable works
Villaurrutia's notable works include his poetic writings, beginning with Reflejos in 1926 and  Nocturnos in 1933. Villaurrutia's writing becomes darker in his later poetic works: Nostalgia de la muerte (literally meaning "Nostalgia of death") in 1938, and Décima muerte (literally "tenth death") in 1941. It is unclear if this change was due to the increased turmoil in Europe that would lead to World War II or simply due to Villaurrutia's increasing age. The preoccupation with death in Villaurrutia's work climaxed with his 1941 play, Invitación à la muerte, the title of which can be literally translated to "Invitation to the death" (see "References" below regarding Dr. Raymond Marion Watkins's book which chronicles a history and analysis of this play, which Watkins demonstrates was heavily influenced by Villaurrutia's integration of dramatic elements traceable to William Shakespeare's "Hamlet.")  The final published work of Villaurrutia came posthumously in 1953 with the publication of Poesía y teatro completos, a collection of his works which included the short theatrical dramas, Autos profanos.

Inspiration
Xavier Villaurrutia was greatly influenced by the work of Ramón López Velarde as well as by several other Mexican poets. He has been a major influence for many poets, including Octavio Paz (who was his student) and Alí Chumacero.

Commemoration
Since 1955, there has been a Xavier Villaurrutia Award for literary works published in Mexico, selected by a jury of writers. This award has been sponsored by the Consejo Nacional para la Cultura y las Artes since 1991.

References

Links 
 The Columbia Electronic Encyclopedia, 6th ed.
 
 For more information on Villaurrutia's "Invitación a la Muerte," see Dr. Raymond Marion Watkins's From Elsinore to Mexico City: The Pervasiveness of Shakespeare's Hamlet in Xavier Villaurrutia's Invitación à la Muerte—published in Saarbrücken, Germany, by VDM Verlag, 2008.  Dr. Watkins's book also includes extensive documentation of Villaurrutia's study at Yale University's Drama School from 1935–36, the only time Villaurrutia left his native Mexico City.

1903 births
1950 deaths
Mexican male poets
Mexican people of Basque descent
Gay poets
Mexican LGBT poets
Mexican LGBT dramatists and playwrights
Mexican male dramatists and playwrights
Gay dramatists and playwrights
20th-century Mexican poets
20th-century Mexican dramatists and playwrights
20th-century Mexican male writers
Mexican magazine founders
Mexican literary critics
20th-century Mexican LGBT people